Anderida is a genus of snout moths. It was described by Carl Heinrich in 1956.

Species
Anderida peorinella Blanchard & Knudson, 1985
Anderida sonorella (Ragonot, 1887)

References

Phycitinae
Pyralidae genera
Taxa named by Carl Heinrich